Amrutulu is a village and also a gram panchayat in the Surada block of Ganjam district in Odisha, India. Amrutulu Panchayat consists of four villages, Amrutulu, Balighai, Buguda and Pankalabadi.

Geography 
It is situated at south-western part of Surada, 9 km. from Surada.

Educational institutions 
 Govt. Upgraded High School, Amrutulu (founded 1912)
 Govt. Upper Primary School, Buguda (founded 1952)
 Govt. Primary School, Balighai (founded 1913)

Notable residents 
 Purna Chandra Swain, current Member of the Legislative Assembly for Surada since 2014.

References

Villages in Ganjam district